Velika Pisanica is a village and municipality in Bjelovar-Bilogora County, Croatia. There are 1,781 inhabitants in the municipality, of whom 72% are Croats, and 13% are Serbs (2011 census).

References

Municipalities of Croatia
Populated places in Bjelovar-Bilogora County